The House of Seckendorff (also: Seckendorf) is the name of an old and prolific Franconian noble family.  According to historian Werner Wagenhöfer, the Seckendorff family is the most researched family of the low nobility in Franconia along with the Guttenberg and Bibra families.

Historical holdings 

 From 13th century to now Obernzenn, Blaues and Rotes Schloss
 to now: Schloss Unternzenn
 ? - ? Schloss Unteraltenbernheim
 1317–1782 Castle and village Langenfeld (Mittelfranken) and Ullstadt
 1347–1375 Oberndorf bei Möhrendorf
 Since 1361 Schnodsenbach
 1361–1379 Monheim
 1369–1518 (ca.) Neuendettelsau, about 1403 division between the Seckendorf and the Vestenberg family 
 1395–1500 (ca.) Rittergut Obersteinbach bei Neustadt/Aisch (mit Frankfurt, Langenfeld, Lachheim, Roßbach und Stübach)
 before 1417–1503 Burg Hiltpoltstein in the county of Forchheim
 1422–1447 Rieterschloss in Kornburg
 1444–1453 Burg Reicheneck by Happurg
 1448–1452 Fürerschloss in Haimendorf
 beginning 1455  Rauschenberg, Bergtheim, Höchstadt, Taschendorf, Obertaschendorf.
 1465–1722 the fief Buch by Weisendorf
 until 1479 Schloss Rezelsdorf by Weisendorf
 1478–fifteen hundreds Festung Rothenberg by Schnaittach
 1503–1528 Hüttenbach by Simmelsdorf
 beginning 1504 properties in Oberlindach by Weisendorf
 1504–1570 Simmelsdorf
 1527–1653 Obbach
 until 1531 Reichenschwand
 until 1558 Eismannsberg
 until 1600 Schloss Triesdorf
 ? - ? Altheim bei Dietersheim
 Mid 15th - Mid 17th Hallerndorf (Linie derer von Seckendorf zu Krotendorf, Schnodsenbach, Gugenheim, Hallerndorf und Rossbach)
 ? Gugenheim 
 ? Krotendorf
 ? - ? Almoshof 
 1677–1945 Schloss Meuselwitz, Thüringen
 1705 - today Schloss Ebneth (Owner: Isabelle Callens née von Seckendorff)
 ? - today Schloss Trautskirchen (Owner: Isabelle Callens née von Seckendorff)
 1726 - today estate at Weingartsreuth (Owner: Freiherr von Seckendorff-von Witzleben)
 1720–1727 Schloss Harrlach by Allersberg
 1720–1774 Seckendorff-Eggloffsteinsche Freihaus in Kornburg
 1757–1952 Schloss Unterleinleiter, Fränkische Schweiz
 1840 -1945 Schloss Broock, Vorpommern-Greifswald
 1858 - today Schloss Strössendorf

Coat of arms

Well known family members 
 Burkard von Seckendorff-Jochsberg (died 1365)
 Hans von Seckendorff (um 1530), Amtmann in Ansbach
 Kaspar von Seckendorff (died 1595), Prince-Bishop of Eichstätt
 Veit Ludwig von Seckendorff (1626–1692), German Statesman
 Friedrich Heinrich von Seckendorff (1673–1763), Imperial field marshal 
 Christoph Friedrich von Seckendorff-Aberdar (1679–1759), Diplomat and Brandenburg-Ansbach Minister
 Karl Siegmund von Seckendorff (1744–1785), German poet
 Johann Karl Christoph von Seckendorff (1747–1814), Wurttemberg State Minister
 Theresius von Seckendorf-Aberdar (auch: Seckendorff; 1758–1825), German biographer, novelist, Hispanist and lexicographer
 Christian Adolf von Seckendorff (1767–1833), German poet
 Friedrich Bernhard von Seckendorff (1772−1852), German politician
 Franz Karl Leopold von Seckendorf-Aberdar (1775–1809), German poet
 Gustav Anton von Seckendorff (1775–1823), German author, actor and declaimer
 Alfred von Seckendorff (1796–1876), German Administrative lawyer and writer
 Fanny Løvenskiold (1807-1873), born Francisca Veronika von Seckendorf-Aberdar, Norwegian court official and daughter of Johan Carl August Max von Seckendorf-Aberdar
 August Heinrich von Seckendorff (1807–1885), German statesman and lawyer
 Henriette von Seckendorff-Gutend (1819–1878), „Heilerin“, Mutter der Kranken und Schwermütigen, Gründerin der Villa Seckendorff in Stuttgart-Bad Cannstatt 
 Oskar von Seckendorff (1840–1902), Prussian Major General
 Siegmund Karl Ludwig Friedrich Hermann von Seckendorf-Gudent; died in 1844 as a forestry student at Forstakademie Tharandt in a duel with his fellow student Otto Carl Werther 
 Rudolf von Seckendorff (1844–1932), lawyer and president of the Reichsgericht (Imperial Court of Justice)  (1905–1920)
 Arthur von Seckendorff-Gudent (1845–1886), Austrian forester, Swiss origin
 Gustav von Seckendorff (1848–1924), Prussian General of the Infantry
 Carl August Ludwig Wilhelm Freiherr von Seckendorff-Aberdar (1848-1948) Co-founder of scouting movement in Germany/Austria
 Albert von Seckendorff (1849–1921), German Vice-Admiral, diplomat, Marshall of the court of Prince Heinrichs von Preußen
 Adolf von Seckendorff (1857–1941), German General of the Infantry, Governor of Estland
 Götz von Seckendorff (1889–1914), German painter and sculptor
 Erich Erwin Heinrich August Veit Freiherr von Seckendorff (1897–1944) was a German general during World War II. He was  a recipient of the Knight's Cross of the Iron Cross of Germany.
 Christa von Seckendorff (born 1970), German artist

Literature 
 Genealogisches Handbuch des Adels. Adelslexikon.  Band XIII, Band 128 der Gesamtreihe. C. A. Starke Verlag, Limburg (Lahn) 2002, .

References

External links 

 Wappen der Seckendorff im Ortenburger Wappenbuch von 1466 und Augsburger Wappenbuch von 1475 und im Sammelband mehrerer Wappenbücher, um 1530
 Seckendorff (zeno.org)

Bavarian noble families